Residencia Presidencial Mburuvicha Róga (Guarani for House of the Chief) is a building in Asuncion, Paraguay, that serves as the official residence for the President and First Lady of Paraguay, and is also the official headquarters of the Office of the First Lady of the Nation.

The complex was built in 1930, and it is composed of the house along 20 hectares of gardens.

The original expression is that of the house of the Guarani chief.  Later, the name was adapted to mean the house of the President of the Republic.  As Mburuvicha means "chief," the expression could be expanded to mean the house of the highest official in the particular social setting.

External links
 Presidency of the Republic of Paraguay
 Office of the First Lady of the Nation - Republic of Paraguay

Buildings and structures in Asunción
Residential buildings in Paraguay
Government buildings in Paraguay
Government of Paraguay
Houses completed in 1930
Government buildings completed in 1930
Presidential residences
1930 establishments in Paraguay